Graham Speake (born 9 June 1946, London) is a British classical philologist and Byzantinist.

Education
After attending St Paul's School in London, Speake studied Classics at Trinity College, Cambridge, where he won various prizes for, among other things, poetry in ancient Greek. He continued his studies at Christ Church, Oxford, where he was awarded a doctorate for an unpublished dissertation on the Byzantine transmission of ancient Greek literature.

Career
Speake was subsequently an academic publisher for forty years. His publications include the Penguin Dictionary of Ancient History (1995) and the two-volume Encyclopedia of Greece and the Hellenic Tradition (2000). In 1996, he was elected Fellow of the Society of Antiquaries of London.

Among other positions, he also worked for twelve years as a guest lecturer on Swan Hellenic Cruises. In 1988 he visited Mount Athos for the first time, to which he subsequently made frequent pilgrimages.

In 1990, with Derek Hill, he founded the Friends of Mount Athos society, under the patronage of Charles, Prince of Wales. As of 2022, he is President of the society.

In 1999, he was received into the Greek Orthodox Church at Vatopedi Monastery. For his book Mount Athos: Renewal in Paradise (2002) he received the 2002 Criticos Prize, awarded by the Society for the Promotion of Hellenic Studies. A second edition of the book was published in 2014.

Personal life
In the 1970s, he married Jennifer Speake (née Jennifer Drake-Brockman), a Canadian writer who later became an editor at Oxford University Press.

Selected works

References

Living people
1946 births
Alumni of Christ Church, Oxford
Alumni of Trinity College, Cambridge
British Byzantinists
Scholars of Byzantine history
People associated with Mount Athos
Writers from London
Fellows of the Society of Antiquaries of London
Hellenists
Historians of Christianity
Scholars in Eastern Orthodoxy
English Eastern Orthodox Christians
Converts to Eastern Orthodoxy